The Polabian language was a West Slavic language that was spoken by the Polabian Slavs in present-day northeastern Germany around the Elbe (/Laba/ in Slavic) river, from which derives its name ("po Labe" – 'unto Elbe' or '[traveling] on Elbe'). It was spoken approximately until the rise to power of Prussia in the mid-18th century – when it was superseded by Low German – in the areas of Pomoré (Mecklenburg-West Pomerania), central (Mittelmark) part of Branibor (Brandenburg) and eastern Saxony-Anhalt (Wittenberg originally part of Béla Serbia), as well as in eastern parts of Wendland (Lower Saxony) and Dravänia (Schleswig-Holstein), Ostholstein and Lauenburg). Polabian was also relatively long (until the 16th century) spoken in and around the cities of Bukovéc (Lübeck), Starigard (Oldenburg) and Trava (Hamburg). The very poorly attested Slavic dialects of Rügen seemed to have had more in common with Polabian than with Pomeranian varieties. In the south, it bordered on the Sorbian language area in Lusatia. 

By the 18th century, Lechitic Polabian was in some respects markedly different from other Slavic languages, most notably in having a strong German influence. It was close to Pomeranian and Kashubian, and is attested only in a handful of manuscripts, dictionaries and various writings from the 17th and 18th centuries.

History
About 2800 Polabian words are known; of prose writings, only a few prayers, one wedding song and a few folktales survive. Immediately before the language became extinct, several people started to collect phrases and compile wordlists, and were engaged with folklore of the Polabian Slavs, but only one of them appears to have been a native speaker of Polabian (himself leaving only 13 pages of linguistically relevant material from a 310-page manuscript). The last native speaker of Polabian, a woman, died in 1756, and the last person who spoke limited Polabian died in 1825.

The most important monument of the language is the so-called Vocabularium Venedicum (1679–1719) by Christian Hennig.

The language left many traces to this day in toponymy; for example, Wustrow "Place on the island", Lüchow, Sagard, Gartow, Krakow etc. It is also a likely origin of the name Berlin, from the Polabian stem / ('swamp').

Phonology
For Polabian the following segments are reconstructable:

Vowels

Consonants

Stress and vowel reduction 
Polabian had free and mobile stress, which means its placement could not be predicted based on the shape of the word, and it could shift to other syllables in inflection and derivation, much like in Russian. Four-syllable words with stress on the last syllable had secondary stress on the second one.

Stress was interconnected with vowel reduction. Thus for example a four syllable word stressed on the third syllable had full vowels in the second and third syllable; but if this same word had stress on the last syllable, it had full vowels in the second and fourth syllable.

Reduced vowels were very short, so much that the transcribers (who mostly spoke Low German) sometimes omitted them in places where they could be expected, which was probably not caused by the ellipsis of said vowels, but rather by their very short duration. The full vowels were noticeably long and were often marked as such in the texts.

The Lord's Prayer

The Lord's Prayer in Polabian and related Lechitic languages, compared to Upper Sorbian, Old Church Slavonic, German and English: Germanic loanwords, which are comparatively rare in the other West Slavic languages, are highlighted in bold.

Notes

References

 Polański, Kazimierz; Sehnert, Janusz Sehnert. Polabian-English Dictionary. The Hague: Mouton, 1967.
 

Słownik etymologiczny języka Drzewian połabskich, Part 1: ed. Tadeusz Lehr-Spławiński & Kazimierz Polański, Wrocław, 1962, from Part 2 on: ed. K. Polański, Wrocław, 1971–

See also

Wends
Polabians (tribe)
Veneti 
House of Griffins

Lechitic languages
Extinct Slavic languages
Languages of Germany
Languages extinct in the 18th century